Heartthrob or Heart Throb may refer to:
 "Heart Throb" (The Super Mario Bros. Super Show!), a live-action episode of The Super Mario Bros. Super Show!
 "Heartthrob" (Angel), an episode of the American television show Angel
 Heartthrob (album),  studio album by Tegan and Sara
 Heartthrob (film), a 2017 American thriller film 
 Heart Throb (My Little Pony), a Pegasus pony in the My Little Pony franchise
 Heart Throbs, a romance comic published by Quality Comics and DC Comics
 The Heart Throbs, an American professional wrestling tag team
 The Heart Throbs (band), a British indie-rock band